Krzysztof Sadzawicki (born 20 February 1970) is a retired Polish football defender.

References

1970 births
Living people
Polish footballers
Olimpia Poznań players
Lechia Gdańsk players
Polonia Warsaw players
Śląsk Wrocław players
GKS Katowice players
RKS Radomsko players
Radomiak Radom players
Association football defenders
Ekstraklasa players